Pangio bitaimac is a species of cyprinid fish. It is endemic to Sumatera (Indonesia) and only known from the Batang Hari River basin. It occurs in small tributary freshwater streams.

Pangio bitaimac grows to  standard length.

References

Pangio
Taxa named by Maurice Kottelat
Fish described in 2009
Cyprinid fish of Asia
Freshwater fish of Java
Endemic fauna of Java
Taxa named by Heok Hui Tan